Argyresthia pseudotsuga is a moth of the family Yponomeutidae. It is found in North America, including Washington.

Adults emerge in April.

The larvae feed on Pseudotsuga menziesii. They mine the twigs and tips of their host plant. The larvae enter the twigs at a node mining in a spiral pattern around the new wood, or directly into the wood. They continue feeding until late fall when they move to the base of the twig and construct a pupal chamber. Pupation takes place around the end of January.

References

Moths described in 1972
Argyresthia
Moths of North America